Emerald Records is also a current record label operated by Cliff Ayers Ostermyer. It is located in Fort Wayne, Indiana, with offices in Nashville, Tennessee.

External links 
 Emerald Records web site

See also 
 List of record labels
 Emerald Records (disambiguation)

American record labels